Grange Corner is an unincorporated community in Sugar Creek Township, Parke County, in the U.S. state of Indiana.

History
The community derives its name from the National Grange.

Geography

References

Unincorporated communities in Indiana
Unincorporated communities in Parke County, Indiana